Ammayilu Abbayilu is a 2003 Indian Telugu-language romantic film starring Vijay Sai, Mohit, Sonu Sood, Debina, and Vidya.

Cast
 Vijay as Prasad 
 Sonu Sood as Rakesh
 Mohit as Sanjay 
 Debina Bonnerjee as Anju 
 Vidya Rao as Manju
 Madhumitha as Ranjani 
 Swapna Madhuri
 Subhashini
 Ravi Babu
 Chalapati Rao
 Surya
 Krishna Bhagavaan 
 Chitram Seenu 
 Dharmavarapu Subramanyam
 Lakshmipati
 Ramya Sri 
 Devi Charan

Soundtrack

The music of this film was composed by Chakri and the lyrics were written by Bhaskarabhatla Ravikumar.

References

External links
 

2000s Telugu-language films
Films directed by Ravi Babu
Films scored by Chakri